General Flagg is the code name as well as the rank and surname of two fictional characters from the toyline, cartoon and comic series, G.I. Joe: A Real American Hero.

The original Brigadier General Lawrence J. Flagg is a character who was created specifically for the comics to serve as the G.I. Joe Team's commanding officer during the early issues of the comic's run before he was eventually killed off (the USS Flagg aircraft carrier was named after him). Brigadier General James L. Flagg III, his son, was a character later introduced for the toyline to serve a similar role.

Original General Flagg

Lawrence J. Flagg was a Brigadier General in the US Army. Hailing from a long family line of soldiers, General Flagg served the better part of his life in the Armed Forces. In the 1970s, he was responsible for creating Special Counter-Terrorist Group Delta, in response to rising terrorist threats, especially the evil Cobra Organization. Flagg dubbed the team G.I. Joe, in honor of the team that had been headed by Lt. Joseph Colton some years before. General Flagg led the team in more of an advisory capacity, choosing Colonel Clayton "Hawk" Abernathy as field leader, and allowing Hawk to make most of the membership and operations decisions.

Marvel Comics
The general is featured early on in the Marvel Comics run. He was the first commander of the G.I. Joe Team and appeared in the first issue. He sends the team in to a Cobra fortress to rescue Dr. Adele Burkhardt, a nuclear physicist and pacifist. In the second issue, he sends a four-man Joe team to the Arctic Circle, to investigate the deaths of military men stationed there. In both situations, he works closely with General Austin, who would be an ally of the Joe team for years to come. He has a cameo directing the disposition of Cobra prisoners and related supplies.

In issue #5, Flagg becomes involved in the action, when Cobra's role in a military parade is uncovered by several men under his command. Flagg goes after Cobra Commander personally. The Cobra Commander fires one shot, creasing Flagg's temple, and then fades into the crowd. When questioned by one of his men why he did not fire back, as he is known for his pistol skills, General Flagg simply looks at several nearby children. He had not fired, because they had been too close to the action.

In issue #19, Cobra forces attack the Joe Headquarters, The Pit. General Flagg is in the brig, which contains two prisoners, Major Bludd and a prominent Cobra Officer named Scar-Face. Bludd escapes, killing Flagg in the process. General Flagg is buried in Arlington Cemetery, with most of the Joes attending. Cobra tries to attack the funeral with a Rattler plane. Before anyone is actually hurt, two new Joes, Duke and Roadblock shoot the plane down. It crashes and explodes in an open field.

In issue #42, the ill General Austin is misidentified as General Flagg.

Devil's Due
General Flagg is shown in the full G.I. Joe character roster, on the cover of the first issue of "World War III", along with his son. The America's Elite series also had General Flagg in a flashback to the early days of G.I. Joe. An undercover operative is using a public payphone to report to General Flagg; the man tries to convince his superior that many Cobra soldiers are not "bad", just confused.

In an alternate continuity, General Flagg starts the G.I. Joe Team in response to an alien robot attack on a Presidential press conference.

Sunbow cartoon
General Flagg appeared in the Sunbow/Marvel G.I. Joe cartoon. He is shown in the first G.I. Joe animated mini-series "The MASS Device", but for the course of the series' run, he never appeared again. The character also carries excess weight, and his physical traits are more akin to General Aaron "Iron Butt" Austin, another character from the comics.

Toys
The original General Flagg did not receive his own action figure until 2004, when his figure was included in a "Comic Pack" release. Packaged with him was G.I. Joe member Steeler, and a generic Cobra officer. This three-pack came with a reprint of the comic book G.I. Joe issue #5, where all three characters play prominent roles. Flagg's dossier on the package actually used the same text as the earlier "General Flagg" figures, which represented his son.

Son of General Flagg

General Flagg was released as part of the "A Real American Hero" toyline in 1992. James Longstreet Flagg III, born in Alexandria, Virginia, is the son of General Lawrence Flagg. He is a graduate of the Virginia Military Institute, and in a short time, he is able to rise up to the rank of Brigadier General. The figure was repainted and released as part of the "Battle Corps" line in 1993, and both figures came with an armored catapult that actually could shoot small projectiles.

According to his filecard, he always liked to be "in the thick of it" instead of shouting orders from a comfortable position. When leading his troops into a fight, he needs "devastating personal weapons", which is why he prefers the G.I. Joe "Brawler" vehicle. His strategies on battlefield have twice earned him the medal of valor and countless decorations, as he carries on his family's proud military tradition. His personal motto is: "I didn't reach the rank of general by standing in the shadows. I got out and earned it on the front lines".

He currently holds an honorary position with the G.I. Joe Team, though his primary role tends to be behind the scenes, warding off any machinations of administrators who would interfere with G.I. Joe operations. In the few instances that have called for it though, General Flagg has demonstrated the tenacity and character of his father, risking his neck alongside the men and women he's leading.

Devil's Due comics
His only appearance in comics continuity was in the World War III event, from the G.I. Joe: America's Elite comic book series. He is shown in the full G.I. Joe character roster on the cover of issue #25, along with his father.

Live action film
General Flagg will be appearing in G.I. Joe: Ever Vigilant.

References

External links
 General Flagg at JMM's G.I. Joe Comics Home Page

Comics characters introduced in 1982
Fictional brigadier generals
Fictional characters from Philadelphia
Fictional characters from Virginia
Fictional United States Army Special Forces personnel
Fictional military strategists
Fictional murdered people
Male characters in animated series
Male characters in comics
G.I. Joe soldiers